Christopher Bruce Evans (September 14, 1946 – May 9, 2000) was a Canadian professional ice hockey defenceman.

Career 
Evans played in the National Hockey League with the Toronto Maple Leafs, Buffalo Sabres, St. Louis Blues, Detroit Red Wings, and Kansas City Scouts. He played in the World Hockey Association with the Calgary Cowboys, Birmingham Bulls, and Quebec Nordiques.

In his NHL career, Evans appeared in 204 games. He scored eleven goals and added 51 assists. He also played in 241 WHA games, scoring nineteen goals and adding 42 assists.

Career statistics

Regular season and playoffs

External links

1946 births
2000 deaths
Birmingham Bulls players
Buffalo Sabres players
Calgary Cowboys players
Canadian expatriate ice hockey players in the United States
Canadian ice hockey defencemen
Cincinnati Swords players
Denver Spurs players
Detroit Red Wings players
Kansas City Blues players
Kansas City Scouts players
Phoenix Roadrunners (WHL) players
Quebec Nordiques (WHA) players
Ice hockey people from Toronto
St. Louis Blues players
Toronto Maple Leafs players
Toronto Marlboros players
Tulsa Oilers (1964–1984) players
Wichita Wind players